William Henry Denham Rouse (30 May 1863 – 10 February 1950) was a pioneering British teacher who advocated the use of the "direct method" of teaching Latin and Greek.

Life
Rouse was born in Calcutta, British India on 30 May 1863. After his family returned home on leave to Britain Rouse was sent to Regent's Park College in London, where he studied as a lay student. In 1881 he won a scholarship to Christ's College, Cambridge. He achieved a double first in the Classical Tripos at the University of Cambridge, where he also studied Sanskrit.  He became a Fellow of Christ's College in 1888.

After brief spells at Bedford School (1886–1888) and Cheltenham College (1890–1895), he became a master at Rugby School, where he encouraged Arthur Ransome to become a writer,  against his parents' wishes. Ransome later wrote: "My greatest piece of good fortune in coming to Rugby was that I passed so low into the school ... that I came at once into the hands of a most remarkable man whom I might otherwise never have met. This was Dr W.H.D. Rouse."

Rouse was appointed headmaster of The Perse School, Cambridge, in 1902.  He restored it to a sound financial footing following a crisis. He believed firmly in learning by doing as well as by seeing and hearing. Although the curriculum at the Perse was dominated by classics, he urged that science should be learned through experiment and observation.  He was described by the archivist of The Perse School as the school's greatest headmaster: "Rouse was strongly independent to the point of eccentricity. He hated most machines, all bureaucracy and public exams."  He retired from teaching in 1928.

In 1911 Rouse started a successful series of summer schools for teachers to encourage the use of the direct method of teaching Latin and Greek. The Association for the Reform of Latin Teaching (ARLT) was formed in 1913 as a result of these seminars.

The same year, James Loeb chose W.H.D. Rouse, together with two other eminent classical scholars, T. E. Page and Edward Capps, to be founding editors of the Loeb Classical Library.

Rouse is known for his plain English prose translations of Homer's Odyssey (1937) and Iliad (1938). He is also recognized for his translations of some of Plato's dialogues, including The Republic, Apology, Crito, and Phaedo.

Rouse died in Hayling Island on 10 February 1950.

References

Further reading
 Great Dialogues of Plato translated by W. H. D. Rouse (Signet Classics) 
 The Living Word: W. H. D. Rouse and the Crisis of Classics in Edwardian England by Christopher Stray (Bristol Classical Press, 1992)

External links
 
 
 
 

1863 births
1950 deaths
Alumni of Christ's College, Cambridge
Alumni of Regent's Park College, London
English classical scholars
Fellows of Christ's College, Cambridge
People educated at Cheltenham College
Greek–English translators
Headmasters of the Perse School
Translators of Homer
Presidents of the Folklore Society